Ann Blandford FHEA is Professor of Human-Computer Interaction (HCI) at University College London (UCL). She serves as deputy director of the UCL Institute of Healthcare Engineering. Her research focuses on behaviour change, well-being, and human errors in the field of healthcare.

Education 
Blandford graduated with a Bachelor of Arts in mathematics from the University of Cambridge. She worked as a software engineer before pursuing a PhD in artificial intelligence (AI) and education at the Open University supervised by Eileen Scanlon and Mark Elsom-Cook.

Career and research
Blandford previously served as professor at the interaction design centre at Middlesex University from 1995 to 2001.  

Blandford has served as professor in human-computer interaction at UCL since 2002, where her research has involved studies of serendipity, leading to a proposal for a new definition of the phenomenon. With Stephann Makri she worked to further refine their classification of "serendipitous occurrences". Her current work covers HCI research in digital health, including challenges of interdisciplinarity.

Awards and honours
In 2016, Blandford became one of the first 12 women to receive a Suffrage Science award for contributions to the field of maths and computing.

References 

Year of birth missing (living people)
Living people
Alumni of the University of Cambridge
Alumni of the Open University
Academics of Middlesex University